Colin Michael Touchin (3 April 1953 – 30 September 2022) was a British conductor, composer and music educator. His compositions include two oratorios, four orchestral sinfoniettas, and works for wind band and choral groups.

Biography
Colin Touchin was educated at William Hulme's Grammar School and Keble College, Oxford.

Touchin taught for eight years at Chetham's School of Music, and for two years was Head of Composition. For over a decade he was Director of Music at the University of Warwick. While in the UK he played in a piano duo with his friend Peter Donohoe.  In 2005 he founded and conducted the Spires Philharmonic Orchestra and Chorus in Coventry, made up of professional and skilled amateur musicians from the Coventry and Warwickshire area. Spires recorded a CD of his compositions in 2012.

In Frankfurt he was Chief Conductor of the Lufthansa Orchestra, an ensemble made up of pilots, flight attendants, technicians and office workers who make music in their spare time. In Hong Kong he was Musical Director of the Hong Kong Welsh Male Voice Choir, the a capella female choir Grace Notes, and guest conductor of the City Chamber Orchestra of Hong Kong and Tak-Ming Philharmonic Winds.

His home was in Warsaw, where he died of pancreatic cancer.

Selected works
  A Beade of Amber (for the National Youth Wind Orchestra of Wales)
 Brief Intervals for saxophone quartet
 Choose the Light, oratorio (2012)
 Coventry Suite for orchestra
 Hilarion, oratorio for baritone, choir and orchestra (1987)
Idyllwild Suite for wind band
 Impressions of Don Giovanni, chamber ensemble (1991)
 in memoriam Cathy, chamber ensemble
 Lambs & Tygers for chorus and orchestra
 Little Red Riding Hood, ballet for youth orchestra
 Saint George of Coventry, chorus and orchestra
 Sinfonietta No 2 for orchestra (1982)
 Sinfonietta No.4 for orchestra (2021)
 Sonatella for piano (1990)
 Three Suffolk Pictures for wind band
 Yon twelve-winded sky for string quartet (1991)

References

External links
 Sinfonietta No. 4, City Chamber Orchestra of Hong Kong, cond. Colin Touchin
 Warwick Music Composers
 

1953 births
2022 deaths
English classical composers
English conductors (music)
British male conductors (music)
21st-century classical composers
Alumni of Keble College, Oxford
Academics of the University of Warwick
People educated at William Hulme's Grammar School
English male classical composers
21st-century British conductors (music)
21st-century British male musicians